General elections were held in South Africa in August 1984 to elect Coloured and Indian representatives to their respective houses of the Tricameral Parliament. The Coloured elections for the House of Representatives took place on 22 August, and resulted in a victory for the Labour Party, headed by the Reverend Allan Hendrickse, which won 76 of the 80 seats. The Indian elections for the House of Delegates were held on 28 August and saw the National People's Party emerge as the largest party, winning 18 of the 40 seats. The Indian elections were opposed by the United Democratic Front and were marked by boycotts and protests. Despite the Prohibition of Political Interference Act of 1968 which banned mixed-race political parties, nine Indian members of Hendricke's Labour Party stood as independents, one of whom won a seat and subsequently joined the NPP.

Background
In addition to the whites-only House of Assembly, a November 1983 referendum had approved the creation of two new houses an 80-member House of Representatives for Coloureds and a 40-member House of Delegates for Asians.

Results

House of Representatives

By constituency

House of Delegates

By constituency

Reactions
The United Nations Security Council passed Resolution 554 (1984) condemning the election, declaring it null and void as it was designed to entrench minority rule.

References

External links
BBC News report on the elections and reforms to Apartheid BBC Archive video

General elections in South Africa
South Africa
General
Events associated with apartheid
August 1984 events in Africa